Franklin River in Vancouver Island, British Columbia, is located between Alberni Inlet and Barkley Sound, was named as part of the Vancouver Island Exploration Expedition of 1864. The river was named for Selim Franklin, Esquire, who was Chairman of the Exploration Committee.

The Franklin River flows west into Sproat Narrows in the Alberni Inlet, south of the city of Port Alberni.  The traditional name of the river is Owatchet.

In 1911 Seattle attorney Julius Bloedel and the Bloedel Stewart Welch Company began purchasing Vancouver Island land for logging. Their Franklin River location became one of the largest logging operations in the world. Later in 1938 the company would become the first in British Columbia to plant seedlings in areas that had been logged.

See also
List of rivers in British Columbia

References
 Vancouver Island Exploration Expedition, 1864. (Lands Vault, plan P.2.T.67)
 Source: BC place name cards, or correspondence to/from BC's Chief Geographer or BC Geographical Names Office
 Report of the 1864 Vancouver Island Exploration Expedition, published at Victoria, 1865, p.22; accession NW 971.1 V, V225
 See Victoria Colonist, 27 December 1858 for biographical information about Franklin
 Source: Provincial Archives' Place Names File (the "Harvey File") compiled 1945-1950 by A.G. Harvey from various sources, with subsequent additions
 13 August 1945 on C.3609, as labelled on BC map 2A, 1913 et seq, and as identified in the 1930 BC Gazetteer; Confirmed 8 July 1948 on C.3609

External links
 BC Whitewater Rafting - Rated Class 4 (perhaps 5+ in canyon below Bamfield Road)

Alberni Valley
Rivers of Vancouver Island